Erik Altieri was the executive director of the National Organization for the Reform of Marijuana Laws (NORML). He assumed the role in November 2016. Altieri departed the role in March 2023 to work on broader criminal justice efforts, He was the ninth executive director since NORML's founding in 1970. Previously, he was also the organization's Communications Director, PAC Manager, and Federal Lobbyist. He was the youngest person named executive director in the organization's history, an accomplishment recognized by Forbes Magazine when he was named one of Forbes' 30 Under 30 for Law and Policy in 2017. Altieri is currently based in Washington, DC at NORML's national headquarters where he oversaw the organization's federal efforts and orchestrates the strategy for NORML's 165+ state and local level chapters across the country.

Biography
Altieri was born and raised in Northeast Philadelphia and spent the later part of his childhood residing in South Jersey. He became deeply interested in politics and was drawn into advocacy work by the anti-war activism of the early 2000s over the conflicts in Iraq and Afghanistan. He attended American University in Washington, DC.

After college, Altieri became NORML's Communications Director and ran their federal and state lobbying efforts and legislative out-reach, administered NORML’s social media networks and served as a spokesman to the press from 2007-2015. During this time period he also became the manager of NORML PAC, and worked to elect marijuana reform-friendly candidates at all levels of government. In 2015, he left NORML to explore other political issue activism including campaign finance reform and tax policy. He returned to NORML as executive director in 2016 and presently continues to serve in that role.

References 

American cannabis activists
Year of birth missing (living people)
Living people